The 2006–07 Serie A (known as the Serie A TIM for sponsorship reasons) was the 105th season of top-tier Italian football, the 75th in a round-robin tournament. It was scheduled to begin on 26 and 27 August but was postponed to 2 September 2006 due to the Calciopoli scandal, which led to the absence of Juventus. On 22 April 2007, Internazionale became Serie A champions after defeating Siena, as Roma's loss to Atalanta left Inter with a 16-point advantage with five matches to play.

Events

2006 Italian football scandal

Following the Serie A scandal of 2006, Juventus was relegated to Serie B and deducted 9 points. Fiorentina, Milan and Lazio, were deducted 15, 8 and 3 points respectively but were not relegated. Consequently, Lecce, Messina and Treviso, originally slated for relegation to Serie B, were to remain in Serie A. However, Fiorentina and Lazio successfully appealed and escaped relegation, thus relegating Lecce and Treviso and keeping 20 teams in Serie A.

As part of another inquiry, Reggina were handed a 15-point penalty but were allowed to remain in Serie A. This penalty was reduced to 11 points on appeal.

League halting of February 2007

On 2 February 2007, police officer Filippo Raciti was killed outside the Stadio Angelo Massimino, Catania, in football-related violence during the Sicilian derby between rivals Catania and Palermo. The match, originally scheduled for 4 February at 15:00, was exceptionally advanced on Friday at 18:00 under request of Catania because of the simultaneity with the St. Agatha local celebrations.

The dramatic Sicilian derby events, which followed the murder of Ermanno Licursi, an amateur club manager, beaten to death during a riot in a Terza Categoria league match, led Commissioner Luca Pancalli to call a stop to all football matches in Italy, including Serie A fixtures. Pancalli noted how the league fixtures would not start again until a solution to the violence issue in Italian football is found. The week after, a special law by the government enforced the measures to be taken against violence in football stadia and forbade the presence of supporters inside stadia which didn't agree with mandatory security dispositions, thus enabling Italian football to go on with half of the matches played without audience.

Following the events, Catania was prohibited to play its home matches at Stadio Angelo Massimino for the remaining part of the season, and the club was also forced to play its home matches in neutral grounds without spectators (a porte chiuse, behind closed doors). Several other Italian stadia were closed too because of security reasons, and reopened only once they would have passed several safety requirements. All stadiums were successfully reopened for April, with Stadio Massimino's exception. Catania's home matches were successively allowed to be attended by spectators, yet on neutral ground, as from 13 May.

Dominant Inter
With their victory over Siena on 22 April 2007, Internazionale captured the 2006–07 Serie A title (the 15th Scudetto in their club history) by moving 16 points clear of second-place Roma with five matches to play. Inter's dominant effort marked the defence of the title they were awarded in the wake of the Calciopoli scandal, and their first Scudetto claimed on the field since 28 May 1989. Clinching with five matches remaining, Inter tied the Serie A record for earliest title claim (along with Torino in the 1947–48 Serie A). The team also broke the record for most consecutive wins with a 17 match winning streak.

Relegation battle
With Messina and Ascoli already relegated, there was only one relegation slot left to be decided in the last matchday, with Parma (39 points), Chievo (39), Catania (38), Siena (37) and Reggina (37) involved in the battle. The key match in the relegation battle was widely expected to be Catania–Chievo, to be played in Bologna because of the forced closure of Stadio Angelo Massimino by the Italian Football Federation (FIGC) following the February 2007 infamous riots in the Sicilian derby. The match ended in a 2–0 win for Catania; due to the contemporary wins of Parma, Siena and Reggina, Chievo were therefore relegated to Serie B.

Team details

Personnels and sponsoring

League table

Top goalscorers

Results

Attendances
Serie A attendances have dropped marginally. Higher attendances in the last couple of weeks increased the final season average for Serie A to 19,720. These are the average Serie A team attendances for the 2006–07 season:

Catania hosted Ascoli, Fiorentina, Inter, Lazio, Reggina, Roma, Siena and Torino at neutral venues without fans, and Milan and Chievo in Bologna, but with fans welcome.

Milan outnumbered every other team for the highest number of season ticket holders with 37,000, with Inter not far behind with 35,000 season ticket holders.

The lowest attendance for the season was recorded in the Ascoli vs Cagliari match, in the final day of the league, that attracted a mere 2,800 people.

Number of teams by region

See also
 2006–07 Serie B
 2006–07 Coppa Italia
 List of Italian football transfers 2006-07

Footnotes

External links
  - All results on RSSSF Website.
 2006/2007 Serie A Squads - (www.footballsquads.com)

Serie A seasons
Italy
1